The Fort Pitt Block House (sometimes called Bouquet's Blockhouse or Bouquet's Redoubt) is a historic building in Point State Park in the city of Pittsburgh. It was constructed in 1764 as a redoubt of Fort Pitt, making it the oldest extant structure in Western Pennsylvania, as well as the "oldest authenticated structure west of the Allegheny Mountains".

Construction
The Block House was constructed in 1764 as a defensive military redoubt. Henry Bouquet initiated the construction of a small number of redoubts around the outer walls of the fort as a way to reinforce its defense, of which only the Fort Pitt Block House survives.

History
When Fort Pitt was demolished in 1792, the Block House was left untouched because it was already in use as a residence. The structure had been converted into a private house in 1785 by Isaac Craig. In 1894, philanthropist Mary Schenley presented the deed to the Block House to the Daughters of the American Revolution (DAR). She did this specifically so that the structure might be preserved for future generations:You are to preserve and keep this relic of a bygone past, and to gather and preserve all obtainable history and tradition in regard to it, and you are to beautify and adorn it and to make it the receptacle of relics bearing on the Colonial and Revolutionary periods of its existence.…I will therefore…leave the ladies of your Society, who have the history of western Pennsylvania at their finger ends, to tell the story of the chivalrous Frenchmen, cruel, crafty Indians, courageous British, and intrepid Colonists. It is fitting that this old landmark, rich in historic associations of more than a century ago, should fall into the hands of those who by birth, tradition, and sentiment are particularly fitted to receive and preserve it and perpetuate the memories of the days when it was occupied by the French and their Indian allies, and afterwards by the British and Colonial troops.

(However, the French had already abandoned control of the area when the blockhouse was built in 1764.)

Industrialist Henry Clay Frick purchased all of the land surrounding the Block House in 1902, shortly before Schenley's death. He offered the DAR $25,000 to move the Block House to Schenley Park; however, the DAR refused. Following lengthy litigation, the Supreme Court of Pennsylvania ruled in favor of the DAR and the Block House, enabling its continued preservation.

The structure has never been torn down, completely rebuilt, or moved during its centuries of existence. Much of its timbers, brick, and stone remain original to its 1764 construction.

Preservation
Although the Block House resides within the boundaries of Point State Park, it is owned and operated by the Fort Pitt Society of the Daughters of the American Revolution. The DAR allows visitors to the park to tour the structure. The building is recognized by the National Register of Historic Places as being the sole surviving historical building in the "Forks of the Ohio (Site of Fort Duquesne and Fort Pitt, Bouquet's Blockhouse)" historic place. It also has a historical marker issued by the commonwealth of Pennsylvania and is a Pittsburgh History & Landmarks Foundation designated Historic Landmark.

Maps and illustrations

Before construction

After construction

References

Notes

Further reading

External links
360° panorama of the Block House exterior
360° panorama of the Block House interior

Tourist attractions in Pittsburgh
Protected areas established in 1974
National Historic Landmarks in Pennsylvania
Historic American Buildings Survey in Pennsylvania
Archaeological sites on the National Register of Historic Places in Pennsylvania
Buildings and structures in Pittsburgh
Infrastructure completed in 1764
History of Pittsburgh
Pittsburgh History & Landmarks Foundation Historic Landmarks
Daughters of the American Revolution museums
Redoubts
1764 establishments in Pennsylvania
National Register of Historic Places in Pittsburgh
Blockhouses